Melanothrix is a genus of moths in the family Eupterotidae.

Species
 Melanothrix alternans Pagenstecher, 1890
 Melanothrix fumosa Swinhoe, 1905
 Melanothrix latevittata Grünberg, 1914
 Melanothrix leucotrigona Hampson, 1893
 Melanothrix nymphaliaria Walker, 1866
 Melanothrix philippina Rothschild, 1917
 Melanothrix sanchezi Schultze, 1925
 Melanothrix semperi Rothschild, 1917

Former species
 Melanothrix homochroa Grünberg, 1914
 Melanothrix intermedia Rothschild, 1917
 Melanothrix nicevillei Hampson, 1896
 Melanothrix radiata Grünberg, 1914

References

Eupterotinae